Erdeborn is a village and a former municipality in the Mansfeld-Südharz district, Saxony-Anhalt, Germany. Since 1 January 2010, it is part of the municipality Seegebiet Mansfelder Land.

History
The first documented mention of Erdeborn is as Hardabrunno in the Hersfeld Tithe Register of 889.

Former municipalities in Saxony-Anhalt
Seegebiet Mansfelder Land